St. Anne's Cathedral, also called Ocaña Cathedral, is a cathedral church of Catholic worship consecrated to St. Anne.  It is a neoclassical building located on the south side of the 29 de mayo park in the city of Ocaña in Norte de Santander department, in the northern part of Colombia. The cathedral is the seat of the Roman Catholic Diocese of Ocaña.

The first church was built in 1564, and it was rebuilt after an earthquake in Cúcuta in 1875. In 1992 the paintings on wood were replaced with new ones with the same iconography dedicated to St Anne.

See also
Roman Catholicism in Colombia

References

Roman Catholic cathedrals in Colombia
Buildings and structures in Norte de Santander Department
Roman Catholic churches completed in 1564
Ocaña, Norte de Santander
16th-century Roman Catholic church buildings in Colombia